Catheys Valley (formerly, Cathay and Cathey's Valley) is a census-designated place in Mariposa County, California, United States. As of the 2020 census, Catheys Valley had a population of 829. Catheys Valley was named after Andrew Cathey, a native of North Carolina, who settled in the valley around 1850. The ZIP Code is 95306. The community is inside area code 209.

History
Cathey's Valley was named after Andrew D. Cathey, born in 1804 in Buncombe, North Carolina. He married Mary Deaver in 1828. Andrew was an adventurous young man in his early life. He decided to leave North Carolina on an exploratory trip to California with the Rowland-Hammond-Wills families from Virginia, North Carolina, and Georgia. Their wagons loaded with household goods, they blazed a trail westward, settling in Benton, Arkansas.

When the California Gold Rush began in 1849, many men left their families in search of gold. Andrew, his son Daniel, and son-in-law Benjamin Wills, traveled by river boat from Fort Smith, Arkansas, to New Orleans and then took a ship to the Isthmus of Panama. In Panama, they boarded a ship bound for San Francisco; from there they caught a stage overland to Indian Gulch in Mariposa County.

In 1851, Andrew returned to Arkansas for his family. The Cathey-Wills, Rowland, and Hammond families organized a wagon train to California. Some of the families were those who had come from North Carolina earlier, leaving the Hammonds to start from Collegeville, Arkansas.

Andrew Cathey was appointed captain of the Cathey-Wills wagon train. About twenty families traveled in covered wagons pulled by oxen. Horses were used to drive the approximate thirty head of cattle. It is said that only one steer was lost on the entire trip, and it was believed stolen by the Indians.

A trip journal shows that they traveled to Fort Smith, Arkansas, where they re-grouped and purchased supplies for the trip that began on April 2. Rather than following the Santa Fe Trail, they traveled the southern route through Fort Bliss near El Paso, Fort Tucson, Arizona, then began following the Gila River. As the wagon train moved across the land, more people joined them. Special duties were assigned to everyone. When they reached the Rio Grande, the wagon beds had to be taken apart and all bolt holes were tightly plugged with wooden pegs. The cracks were caulked with what they had available. Together, they formed a ferry-like raft to transport their families, their livestock, and household goods across the river. The Gearys had started out with the Oatman family. The Oatmans had been warned the Indians were on the warpath.  The Gearys joined with the Cathey wagon train and later they came upon the aftermath of the Oatman Wagon Train. Upon seeing the burned wagons and recognizing Mrs. Oatman's clothing, Mrs Geary was overcome with grief. The Catheys never encountered any hostility by the Indians.

The wagon party took only a very few days off to wash clothes and rest the oxen. It is said many of the women walked barefoot. One serious threat was when their water barrels began to get low, so an order was given: no more water. People and animals were rationed only one or two sips when it was really needed. It had been days since they crossed a stream and mountains were still some distance away. After they had almost given up hope of finding water, one of the teamsmen suddenly noticed his oxen raised their heads and sniffed the air. In good judgment, the teamsman gave the oxen their rein. They immediately left the trail, and on top of a knoll, under a large rock was a basin full of fresh water.

After leaving Fort Yuma, a Mrs. Warner, who had just buried a child en route in New Mexico, gave birth to another child. The family continued on to El Monte, in southern California. The Wills family broke away from the wagon train. The remaining wagon party traveled over the Tejon Pass and across the San Joaquin Valley to just below Millertown, where they crossed the San Joaquin River. They proceeded north, crossing Mariposa Creek and through the McDermott place, up Bear Creek, and on to Indian Gulch where they arrived on October 27, 1852. It was a long, arduous journey of living in tents and wagons for two years and enduring countless hardships. They sold milk from their herd to the miners.

In 1854, Andrew D. Cathey purchased a ranch from a Mr. Evans. Evans drove a hard bargain and Andrew finally agreed to pay him $1,500 for a quit-claim. This became Andrew and his wife Mary's first, new, real home. Her sons lived at home for about ten years before they all became larger independent landowners. Cathey's Valley now bears his name.

Andrew Cathey soon became very involved in civic and political activities. He enjoyed exhibiting his abundant produce in the Merced Fair. A few of his trees and vines are still standing, although very sparse after nearly 150 years.

Andrew and his wife, Mary, very devout Christians, helped build a church, school and cemetery on land they donated.

Recently a large mariposite stone monument was built by many donors and volunteer labor in memory and honor of the Andrew D Cathey family and history of Cathey's Valley. The monument is located at the Cathey's Valley Park. Visitors may read the early history plaque and see the 1879 one-room schoolhouse. The schoolhouse was restored by the Cathey's Valley Historical Society.

The first Catheys Valley post office opened in 1879 and closed in 1881. The Cathay post office opened in 1882, closed in 1918, re-opened in 1919, and changed its name to Catheys Valley in 1964.

Geography

Climate 

Demographics

The 2010 United States Census reported that Catheys Valley had a population of 825. The racial makeup of Catheys Valley was 730 (88.5%) White, 6 (0.7%) African American, 12 (1.5%) Native American, 12 (1.5%) Asian, 1 (0.1%) Pacific Islander, 33 (4.0%) from other races, and 31 (3.8%) from two or more races. Hispanic or Latino of any race were 80 persons (9.7%).

The Census reported that 825 people (100% of the population) lived in households, 0 (0%) lived in non-institutionalized group quarters, and 0 (0%) were institutionalized.

There were 316 households, out of which 93 (29.4%) had children under the age of 18 living in them, 208 (65.8%) were opposite-sex married couples living together, 22 (7.0%) had a female householder with no husband present, 17 (5.4%) had a male householder with no wife present.  There were 16 (5.1%) unmarried opposite-sex partnerships, and 5 (1.6%) same-sex married couples or partnerships. 54 households (17.1%) were made up of individuals, and 17 (5.4%) had someone living alone who was 65 years of age or older. The average household size was 2.61.  There were 247 families (78.2% of all households); the average family size was 2.92.

The population was spread out, with 184 people (22.3%) under the age of 18, 56 people (6.8%) aged 18 to 24, 146 people (17.7%) aged 25 to 44, 300 people (36.4%) aged 45 to 64, and 139 people (16.8%) who were 65 years of age or older.  The median age was 47.2 years. For every 100 females, there were 109.4 males.  For every 100 females age 18 and over, there were 107.4 males.

There were 381 housing units at an average density of 16.2 per square mile (6.3/km), of which 224 (70.9%) were owner-occupied, and 92 (29.1%) were occupied by renters. The homeowner vacancy rate was 2.2%; the rental vacancy rate was 16.7%.  544 people (65.9% of the population) lived in owner-occupied housing units and 281 people (34.1%) lived in rental housing units.

Politics
In the state legislature Catheys Valley is located in the 14th Senate District, represented by Republican Tom Berryhill, and in the 25th Assembly District, represented by Republican Kristin Olsen.

Notable people
 Logan Mankins, former NFL player

References

http://mariposaresearch.net/cathey.htm 

Census-designated places in Mariposa County, California
Census-designated places in California